KGFF (1450 AM) is a radio station licensed to serve Shawnee, Oklahoma, and is owned by the Citizen Potawatomi Nation.

History
The station has operated under varying ownership, but on the same frequency and using the same call letters for the last 75 years.

KGFF was a charter member of the Oklahoma Network when it was formed in 1937.

Programming
1960s, '70s & '80s Pop/Rock are in regular airplay rotation.

FM Translator
KGFF is also broadcast on the following FM translator:

Office Location
KGFF is located at 1570 Gordon Cooper Dr in Shawnee. The air line is 405-273-1450.

References

External links
KGFF website

GFF